Revenue is an album by soprano saxophonist Steve Lacy, recorded in 1993 and released on the Italian Soul Note label.

Reception
The AllMusic review by Chris Kelsey stated: "This music is a fine example of what happens when a visionary musician makes something extending and expanding upon the tradition his life's work. An excellent disc".

Track listing
All compositions by Steve Lacy
 "The Rent" - 8:42 
 "Revenue" - 6:03 
 "This Is It" - 12:11 
 "The Uh Uh Uh" - 7:41 
 "Esteem" - 9:18 
 "I Do Not Believe" - 4:50 
 "Gospel" - 8:15 
Recorded at Barigozzi Studio in Milano, Italy on February 23, 24 & 25, 1993

Personnel
Steve Lacy - soprano saxophone
Steve Potts - alto saxophone, soprano saxophone
Jean-Jacques Avenel - bass
John Betsch -  drums

References

1993 albums
Steve Lacy (saxophonist) albums
Black Saint/Soul Note albums